CenturyLink Tower (formerly Qwest Tower) is a 296,448 sq.ft office building located in downtown Sioux Falls, South Dakota. It is 174 feet tall, has 11 stories, and is the tallest building in the state of South Dakota. Previously the 202-foot Zip Feed Tower was the tallest building in Sioux Falls, as well as South Dakota.

History and appearance
The building has had two different facades; initially it was of white stone, but structural issues that soon developed forced US West (later known as Qwest) to remove the outer facade and later install the present exterior. One portion of this building was actually constructed of brick and was the original telephone exchange building until its demolition in 2011 to make room for expanded parking.

Modern ownership
The building is now a dispatch center owned by CenturyLink.

See also
List of tallest buildings by U.S. state

References

Buildings and structures in Sioux Falls, South Dakota
Skyscrapers in South Dakota
Modernist architecture in South Dakota
Lumen Technologies
Skyscraper office buildings in South Dakota
1971 establishments in South Dakota
Office buildings completed in 1971